His Majesty's Paymaster General or HM Paymaster General is a ministerial position in the Cabinet Office of the United Kingdom. The incumbent Paymaster General is Jeremy Quin MP.

History

The post was created in 1836 by the merger of the positions of the offices of the Paymaster of the Forces (1661–1836), the Treasurer of the Navy (1546–1835), the Paymaster and Treasurer of Chelsea Hospital (responsible for Army pensions) (1681–1835) and the Treasurer of the Ordnance (1670–1835).

Initially, the Paymaster General only had responsibilities in relation to the armed services but in 1848 two more offices were merged into that of Paymaster General: the Paymaster of Exchequer Bills (1723–1848) and the Paymaster of the Civil Service (1834–1848), the latter followed by its Irish counterpart in 1861. They thus became 'the principal paying agent of the government and the banker for all government departments except the revenue departments and the National Debt Office'.

From 1848 to 1868, the post was held concurrently with that of Vice-President of the Board of Trade.

The longest-serving holder of the post was Dawn Primarolo, whose portfolio covered HM Revenue and Customs (formerly the Inland Revenue and HM Customs and Excise) and who served from 1999 to 2007.

Role
Today, the Paymaster General is usually a minister without portfolio available for any duties which the government of the day may designate. The post may be combined with another office, or may be left unfilled.

Though the Paymaster General was titular head of the Paymaster General's Office, their executive functions were delegated to the Assistant Paymaster General, a permanent civil servant who (though acting in the name of the Paymaster General) was answerable to the Chancellor of the Exchequer.

Office of HM Paymaster General
The Paymaster General was formerly in nominal charge (and at one time in actual charge) of the Office of HM Paymaster General (OPG), which held accounts at the Bank of England on behalf of government departments and selected other public bodies. Funds which were made available from the Consolidated Fund were then channelled into OPG accounts, from where they were used by the relevant body. OPG operated a full range of accounts and banking transaction services, including cheque and credit, BACS and CHAPS services for its customers via an electronic banking system. Integration of OPG accounts held with commercial banks was provided by the private company Xafinity Paymaster which is now part of the Equiniti group.

However, in 2008, the government announced that the Office of the Paymaster General would be incorporated into a new body, the Government Banking Service, which also provides banking operations for HM Revenue & Customs and National Savings and Investments. Following the Bank of England's decision to withdraw from providing retail banking services, retail banking and payment services for the GBS are provided by a range of financial institutions including Barclays, Citibank, NatWest, and Worldpay, although the Bank of England still plays a role in managing the government's higher level accounts.

List of paymasters general

19th century
Sir Henry Parnell, Bt. 1836–1841
Edward Stanley 1841
Sir Edward Knatchbull, Bt. 1841–1845
Bingham Baring 1845–1846
Thomas Babington Macaulay 1846–1848
Granville Leveson-Gower, 2nd Earl Granville 1848–1852
Edward Stanley, 2nd Baron Stanley of Alderley 1852
Charles Abbot, 2nd Baron Colchester 1852
Edward Stanley, 2nd Baron Stanley of Alderley 1853–1855
Edward Pleydell-Bouverie 1855
Robert Lowe 1855–1858
Richard Hely-Hutchinson, 4th Earl of Donoughmore 1858–1859
Algernon Percy, Lord Lovaine 1859
James Wilson 1859
William Cowper 1859–1860
William Hutt 1860–1865
George Goschen 1865–1866
William Monsell 1866
Stephen Cave 1866–1868
Frederick Hamilton-Temple-Blackwood, 1st Earl of Dufferin 1868–1872
Hugh Childers 1872–1873
William Adam 1873–1874
Stephen Cave 1874–1880
David Plunket 1880
George Glyn, 2nd Baron Wolverton 1880–1885
Frederick Lygon, 6th Earl Beauchamp 1885–1886
Thomas Hovell-Thurlow-Cumming-Bruce, 5th Baron Thurlow 1886
Frederick Lygon, 6th Earl Beauchamp 1886–1887
Adelbert Brownlow-Cust, 3rd Earl Brownlow 1887–1889
Victor Child Villiers, 7th Earl of Jersey 1889–1890
Robert Windsor-Clive, 14th Baron Windsor 1890–1892
Charles Seale-Hayne 1892–1895
John Hope, 7th Earl of Hopetoun 1895–1899
Charles Spencer-Churchill, 9th Duke of Marlborough 1899–1902

20th century

Savile Crossley 1902–1905
Richard Causton (1st Baron Southwark after 13 July 1910) 1905–1910
Ivor Guest, 1st Baron Ashby St Ledgers 1910–1912
Edward Strachey, 1st Baron Strachie 1912–1915
Thomas Legh, 2nd Baron Newton 1915–1916
Arthur Henderson 1916
Joseph Compton-Rickett 1916–1919
Tudor Walters 1919–1922
Office vacant 1922–1923
Neville Chamberlain 1923
William Joynson-Hicks 1923
Archibald Boyd-Carpenter 1923–1924
Harry Gosling 1924
Office vacant 1924–1925
George Sutherland-Leveson-Gower, 5th Duke of Sutherland 1925–1928
Richard Onslow, 5th Earl of Onslow 1928–1929
Sydney Arnold 1929–1931
Office vacant 1931
Tudor Walters 1931
Ernest Lamb, 1st Baron Rochester 1931–1935
Robert Hutchison, 1st Baron Hutchison of Montrose 1935–1938
Geoffrey FitzClarence, 5th Earl of Munster 1938–1939
Edward Turnour, 6th Earl Winterton 1939
Office vacant 1939–1940
Robert Gascoyne-Cecil, Viscount Cranborne 1940
Office vacant 1940–1941
Maurice Hankey 1941–1942
William Jowitt 1942
Frederick Lindemann, 1st Baron Cherwell 1942–1945
Office vacant 1945–1946
Arthur Greenwood 9 July 1946 Lab
Hilary Marquand 5 March 1947 Lab
The Viscount Addison 2 July 1948 also Leader of the House of Lords Lab
The Lord Macdonald of Gwaenysgor 1 April 1949 Lab

21st century

List of shadow paymasters general

References

External links
Office of the Paymaster General – archived version, as of June 2008. Since then the OPG website redirects to the new GBS site:
Government Banking Service

United Kingdom Paymasters General
Ministerial offices in the United Kingdom
1836 establishments in the United Kingdom